Castianeira descripta, the redspotted antmimic, is a species of true spider in the family Corinnidae. It is found in the United States and Canada.

References

External links

 

Corinnidae
Articles created by Qbugbot
Spiders described in 1847